Josefina Khamis Jadue (born 26 September 1993) is a field hockey player from Chile.

Personal life
Josefina Khamis is of Palestinian descent, and works as a commercial engineer.

Career

Junior national team
In 2012, Khamis was a member of the Chile U21 team at the Pan American Junior Championship in Guadalajara. Chile finished fourth at the tournament, with Khamis scoring seven goals.

Las Diablas
Josefina Khamis made her debut for Las Diablas in 2010. The following year she won a bronze medal with the team at the 2011 Pan American Games in Guadalajara.

In 2012, she appeared at the qualifying tournament for the 2012 Summer Olympics held in Kakamigahara.

Following a ten year hiatus from the national team, Khamis made her return in 2022 when she was named in the squad for the FIH World Cup in Terrassa and Amsterdam.

References

External links

1993 births
Living people
Chilean female field hockey players
Female field hockey forwards
Pan American Games medalists in field hockey
Pan American Games bronze medalists for Chile
Field hockey players at the 2011 Pan American Games
Medalists at the 2011 Pan American Games
Competitors at the 2022 South American Games
South American Games gold medalists for Chile
South American Games medalists in field hockey
21st-century Chilean women